Ring II (pronounced "ring two", ; also known as Kilonväylä) in the city of Espoo is one of the major highways in Finland. The road runs north–south, connecting Turuntie in the north, to Länsiväylä in the south. Despite its name suggesting a circle, it has not been built as a true beltway yet, unlike the parallel Ring I and Ring III highways.

History 
The road was initially planned in the 1960s, but it was not until the end of 2000 that the first phase was completed.

Future 
Since the cross-city traffic in Espoo, Kauniainen and Vantaa is estimated to nearly double by the year 2025, plans have been made to extend Ring II to connect up with Finnish national road 3 in the northeast and add lanes where the road is currently only one lane wide in each direction.

See also
 Ring I
 Ring III

References

External links 

Ring roads in Finland
Roads in Finland
Transport in Espoo